Antony Lawley 'Tim' Warr (15 May 1913 – 29 January 1995) was an English rugby union player who represented the England national rugby union team. He also played first-class cricket with Oxford University.

Warr's two national caps came during the 1934 Home Nations Championship, where England claimed the triple crown. A winger, he scored a try on debut against Wales and made his other appearance against Ireland.

He played club rugby for Old Leodiensians before joining Wakefield during the 1936/37 season, scoring fourteen tries in twelve games in the two seasons he spent at the club. He also played seven times for Yorkshire and gained a blue for Oxford.

As a cricketer, Warr kept wicket for Oxford University in four first-class matches in 1933 and 1934. He spent some time playing with the Army during the 1940s and in 1950 he represented the Marylebone Cricket Club in a first-class match against Ireland in Dublin.

During the second world war, he was the officer in charge of PT at Sandhurst 

A school teacher by profession, he taught at Leeds Grammar School  before teaching at Harrow School for over thirty years  where he designed the Harrow first XV pitch.

References

External links
Cricinfo: Antony Warr

1913 births
1995 deaths
English rugby union players
England international rugby union players
Wakefield RFC players
English cricketers
Oxford University cricketers
Marylebone Cricket Club cricketers
Rugby union players from Birmingham, West Midlands
Alumni of Brasenose College, Oxford
Wicket-keepers
Rugby union wings